The canton of Mont-sous-Vaudrey is an administrative division of the Jura department, eastern France. It was created at the French canton reorganisation which came into effect in March 2015. Its seat is in Mont-sous-Vaudrey.

It consists of the following communes:
 
Augerans
Bans
La Barre
Belmont
La Bretenière
Chamblay
Champagne-sur-Loue
Chatelay
Chissey-sur-Loue
Courtefontaine
Cramans
Dampierre
Écleux
Étrepigney
Évans
Fraisans
Germigney
Grange-de-Vaivre
La Loye
Montbarrey
Monteplain
Mont-sous-Vaudrey
Mouchard
Nevy-lès-Dole
Orchamps
Ounans
Our
Pagnoz
Plumont
Port-Lesney
Ranchot
Rans
Salans
Santans
Souvans
Vaudrey
La Vieille-Loye
Villeneuve-d'Aval
Villers-Farlay

References

Cantons of Jura (department)